Nasereddine Souïdi (born 30 November 1969), known as Cheb Nasro and after Nasro (Arabic:نصرو) is raï most prolific artist with more than 131 albums to his credit. Nasro has recorded hits including "Ndirek Amour" (I choose you My Love) "Ma Rkhalinich" (Do not Leave Me) and "Enfin Enfin" (finally finally). he is the only Raï artist to sign with an American label, Miles Copeland ARK21/Mondo Melodia.

Biography 

Nasro was born Nasereddine Souidi on 30 November 1969 in Aïn Témouchent and then grew up in the western Algerian city of Oran. His first foray into music came at the age of two when his uncle bought him a drabouka (traditional drum). As a youngster, he often accompanied Cheb Zahounie the wedding makes her solo debut at the age of 17 at a local club Nasro received a standing ovation and was invited to the performances daily from 3 am to 4:00 at the club. within a year, he recorded his debut album and had begun to perform throughout Europe. Despite competition Nasro and Cheb Hasni became close friends. Hope of Nasro early career began to fade after the tragic murder of Cheb Hasni September 29, 1994, while Raï many artists emigrated to Europe or North America, he was one of the few to continue singing in his homeland. He later said "I was very skinny from worry and moved around a lot".

References

External links 

 Cheb Nasro at discogs.com

1969 births
Living people
Raï musicians
Musicians from Oran
20th-century Algerian  male  singers
21st-century Algerian  male  singers
Algerian male film actors
Algerian male television actors
Rotana Records artists